Highfields may refer to:

Places 
Australia
Highfields, New South Wales
Highfields, Queensland

 United Kingdom
Highfields, Cambridgeshire
Highfields, Derbyshire
Highfields, Leicestershire, an inner-city neighbourhood of Leicester
Highfields, South Yorkshire

Other uses 
 Highfields, Buerton, a country house in Cheshire, England
 Highfields (Amwell and Hopewell, New Jersey), the former home of Charles Lindbergh

See also 
 Highfield (disambiguation)
 Highfields School (disambiguation)